Dawa, or Dawacuo, is a lake in Coqên County in the Ngari Prefecture of the Tibet Autonomous Region of China. It is located several kilometres northwest of Coqên Town. Daxiong is a village located beyond its northeastern bank. The name of lake means "Moon Lake" in Tibetan language.

References

Ngari Prefecture
Lakes of Tibet